Sarah Cowley (married name Cowley-Ross, born 3 February 1984) is a New Zealand track and field athlete. She competed at the 2012 Summer Olympics in the women's heptathlon event. She will be reporting from the Tokyo Olympics for TVNZ.

Personal life
Cowley was born to a Samoan father and a Pākehā European New Zealand mother. Her brother Garrick Cowley is a rugby union player who has played for the Samoa national rugby union team.

Achievements

References

1984 births
Living people
New Zealand heptathletes
Olympic athletes of New Zealand
Athletes (track and field) at the 2012 Summer Olympics
Athletes (track and field) at the 2014 Commonwealth Games
Competitors at the 2005 Summer Universiade
Competitors at the 2009 Summer Universiade
Competitors at the 2011 Summer Universiade
Commonwealth Games competitors for New Zealand
New Zealand female hurdlers